Creston School District is the K-12 school district in the Eastern Washington farming community of Creston, Washington.  Due to the small size of the town, the elementary and junior high are in the same building; and the Creston Elementary School has combined classrooms: K, 1st/2nd, 3rd/4th, and 5th/6th. An academic co-op was started in 2016 between Creston School District and the nearby Wilbur School District, allowing all Creston High School students to attend Wilbur-Creston High School in Wilbur and all Wilbur Junior High students to attend Wilbur-Creston Junior High in Creston. Even before the academic co-op, the two school districts enjoyed a sports co-op (Wilbur-Creston Wildcats) that has been in place since 1985.

Schools
 Creston Elementary School
 Wilbur-Creston Junior High School

Demographics
The majority of the students reside outside of Creston.  The district buses students from Deer Meadows, Hawk Creek, Lincoln, Seven Bays, and Sterling Valley.  A small number of students are from towns outside the district, such as Davenport, Harrington, and Electric City. The co-op between Wilbur and Creston means that all high school students are bused to Wilbur, while all junior high students are bused to Creston.

Faculty
The Faculty at Creston includes 19 staff members

Curriculum
While Creston is not a private school, its small size allows its teachers to focus on each student individually, which gives both elementary and junior high students the chance to express themselves and find their own identity. This also provides the students with an excellent and disciplined education that is hard to find elsewhere.

School districts in Washington (state)
Education in Lincoln County, Washington